The Shanghai Cooperation Organization Military Tattoo (Chinese: 上海合作组织军乐节; Russian: Шанхайская организация сотрудничества Военная фестиваль) also known as the SCO Military Tattoo is an annual military music event and military tattoo organized by the Shanghai Cooperation Organisation. 

The musical groups that usually participate in the festival annually are the bands of SCO member states as well as SCO observer states. During the festival, musicians will usually perform for close to 8–10 minutes.

History

2014, Zhurihe
The inaugural tattoo took place at Zhurihe Training Base, Inner Mongolia. It took place during the a large SCO exercise, in which more than 5,000 servicemen took part.

2015, St. Petersburg

It took place on Palace Square in the center of the city. Military soloists took part in the festival for the first time.

2016, Astana

It took place in front of the Baiterek monument near the Astana Opera.

2017, Shanghai

The total number of participants numbered in 426 musicians.

2018, Beijing
It was the first festival to include India and Pakistan since they became full members. A parade featuring the military bands in the festival took place at the Olympic Green.

Notable participants

Festival titles by year

Gallery

Videos

References 

Shanghai Cooperation Organisation
Military music
Festivals established in 2014
Music festivals established in 2014
Military tattoos